Dawn Raid All-Stars are a musical collaboration between Dawn Raid Entertainment and Boost Mobile which brought together all the artists of Dawn Raid as a collective group in 2004.

Discography

Singles

Dawn Raid Entertainment
Hip hop supergroups
Musical groups established in 2004
New Zealand hip hop groups